Poloni is an Italian surname. Notable people with the surname include:

John Poloni (born 1954), American Major League Baseball pitcher
Luigia Poloni (1802–1855), Italian Roman Catholic nun
Mirco Poloni (born 1974), Italian association footballer

See also
Polonia (disambiguation)

Italian-language surnames